Else Herold   (October 17, 1906 – October 29, 1999 in Tübingen) was a German  pianist, piano teacher, and professor at the Musikhochschule Stuttgart. Herold was a pupil of Emil von Sauer, who was a notable pupil of Franz Liszt.

Life
Herold lived in Stuttgart and Tübingen. Numerous recordings of Herold are available at Deutsches Rundfunkarchiv.

External links
DRA: Sonderhinweisdienst Musik 1999 (150.Todestag von Frederic Chopin) Page contains an audio clip of Chopin's Nocturne op. 27/2 recorded in 1942.
DRA Online: Page contains a listing of Chopin recordings by Else Herold and other pianists available at Deutsches Rundfunkarchiv.

German classical pianists
1906 births
1999 deaths
20th-century classical musicians
20th-century classical pianists
20th-century German musicians
German women pianists
Women classical pianists
20th-century German women
20th-century women pianists